Ćamila Mičijević (born 8 September 1994) is a German-born Croatian handball player of Bosnian descent for Metz Handball and the Croatian national team.

Career
Mičijević was born in Heidenheim, Germany to Bosnian immigrants who fled from the Bosnian War. Her parents, Mujo and Jasminka Mičijević, come from Mostar, Bosnia and Herzegovina.

She played at both Lokomotiva and Katarina handball clubs in Mostar before moving to play at Zamet in Croatia, later Dunaújváros in Hungary and Metz in France in 2020. She rose to prominence at the 2020 European Women's Handball Championship when she surprisingly won the bronze medal with Croatia, as one of the team leaders.

Achievements

National
French Women's Handball Championship:
Winner: 2022
Coupe de France:
Winner: 2022

References

External links

1994 births
Living people
Croatian female handball players
ŽRK Zamet players
People from Heidenheim
Sportspeople from Stuttgart (region)
Expatriate handball players
Croatian expatriate sportspeople in France
Croatian expatriate sportspeople in Hungary
Sportspeople from Mostar
Croatian people of Bosniak descent